The Bombardier Flexity Outlook is a series of low-floored, articulated light-rail trams manufactured by Bombardier Transportation. Part of the larger Bombardier Flexity product line (many of which are not low-floor), Flexity Outlook vehicles are modular in design and commonly used throughout Europe.

Types

Bombardier markets two types or families of designs as "Flexity Outlook".

Eurotram

The Eurotram was a design of electric tramcars designed by for use on the network of the Compagnie de Transports Strasbourgeois (CTS). It is initially contracted to Socimi and ABB. After Socimi went bankrupt, the order for Eurotrams was completed by ABB Group. Later models were manufactured under successor companies Adtranz and Bombardier Inc.

Bombardier began to market this type as Flexity Outlook (E), when they made them until 2004.

Cityrunner 
The more common Cityrunner, which has a more traditional tram design, is used by several cities in Austria (in Innsbruck, Linz and Graz), also Łódź (Poland), Geneva (Switzerland), Eskişehir (Turkey), and Brussels (Belgium), and vehicles for Marseille, (France) Valencia,  Alicante (both Spain), Palermo (Italy) and Toronto (Canada) are in the design and production phase.  (Although the Toronto Transit Commission has ordered the Flexity Outlook Cityrunner for its legacy system, Metrolinx has ordered the Flexity Freedom for Toronto's new Eglinton Crosstown line that is under construction along Eglinton Avenue in mid-Toronto.)

While most Flexity Outlook trams are bi-directional, the Toronto cars are single-ended in order to meet the operating requirements of that city's legacy streetcar routes. Bombardier has built single-ended Flexity Outlook versions for cities including Graz, Łódź and Milan.

Its closest competitors are the Citadis from Alstom, the Combino and S70 from Siemens, and Bombardier's other Flexity trams.

Olympic Line 
Bombardier Transportation operated a Flexity Outlook demo system in Vancouver from January 21 to March 21, 2010, coinciding with the 2010 Winter Olympics. The trams were on loan from a fleet of Flexity Outlook series made for the Brussels tram network. The service was called the Olympic Line and used electrified railway right-of-way owned by the City of Vancouver and not part of the regional transit authority (TransLink).

The temporary line operated from Granville Island to near Olympic Village Station on the Canada Line at 2nd Avenue. Service consisted of a  link with two stations, with cars operating every 10 minutes.

See also 
 Bombardier T2000

References

External links 

 Flexity official site

Tram vehicles of Austria
Tram vehicles of Belgium
Tram vehicles of France
Tram vehicles of Italy
Tram vehicles of Poland
Tram vehicles of Portugal
Tram vehicles of Spain
Tram vehicles of Switzerland
Flexity Outlook
Articulated passenger trains

pl:Flexity Outlook